The GSK China scandal was an imbroglio where the China branch of the global drugmaker GlaxoSmithKline (GSK) pleaded guilty to paying bribes to doctors and hospitals to promote the company's products in China.

The scandal started with sex tapes of the company's China head, Mark Reilly and his Chinese girlfriend at a Shanghai department, which were sent to several senior executives of the company. The company's investigations into the sex tapes led to imprisonment of the paid investigator Peter Humphrey and his wife Yu Yingzeng in China, a country which has an opaque judicial system with a 99% conviction rate, on allegations that they had breached privacy law. Humphrey and his wife maintain their innocence and Humphrey claims he was tortured and denied medical treatment due to his refusal to confess to trumped up charges.

After the trial in Changsha in September 2014, the company apologized to the Chinese people, and paid one of the biggest fines in Chinese history worth ¥3bn (£300m; €350m; $490m). 4 executives of the company, including Mark Reilly, the only foreign citizens involved, were sentenced. Reilly received a suspended sentence and was also deported from China. The UK Serious Fraud Office concluded their investigation in 2019 after finding insufficient evidence

Background

Loose control over foreign companies 

China opened up its economy to global corporations since 1978 when it decided to adapt to a more market-driven economy. As American legal academic Jerome Cohen said, "for a long time, there’d been this policy of going easy on foreign enterprises. The government didn’t want to cause embarrassment or give outsiders the impression that China is plagued with corruption. But they’re not thinking like that anymore." However China's rising economic nationalism that favors Chinese companies instead of foreign ones lead to increased scrutiny of foreign firms.

Corruption in China's healthcare system 
According to experts, China's healthcare system is rife with corruption. Fake vaccines and bribes have been employed by doctors to improve their economic condition, According to Leon Liu, partner with the Shanghai-based law firm MWE China, Chinese citizens paid high prices for drugs partly due to corruption, which the government hoped to change. A year before the GSK's scandal, some Chinese companies had been investigated by the Chinese government. Yet, GSK did not pay much attention to the shift in the China market and consistently ignored the warnings of the China bribery before the scandal.

Whistleblower of the China scandal

Emails to Chinese regulators 
Since December 2011, 24 anonymous tips from inside the GSK China were sent to Chinese regulators in 17-month time, which was not known to GSK high executives until April 2012. The tips reported details of GSK's fraud and corruption in China to the regulators. Although the company promised to the US regulators that they would not allow improper marketing and kickbacks to doctors in July 2012 after a remarkable fine, it did not stop doing so in China. Vivian Shi, GSK's head of government affairs in China, was fired as she was believed to be the whistleblower, although officially, she was fired due to "falsification of travel expenses". Vivian Shi then used her connections to the Chinese political system to arrest Peter Humphry on what he alleges were trumped up charges.

Emails to GSK headquarter 
GSK's board received an email in January 2013 where allegations the China branch had committed fraud in its operations was detailed in 5,200 words. The email was written in English. The email said that GSK China disguised tourist travel in the disguise of international academic meetings. The company paid for the airline tickets and hotel rooms for such meetings to bribe Chinese medical professionals. The email continued by accusing GSK China of falsifying its books and records to illegally market drugs in China. The whistleblower made examples by the drug Lamictal, which was approved in China only for treating epilepsy, but was marketed as a drug for bipolar disorder aggressively. The drug killed a patient due to false marketing, but GSK chose to pay around 9,000 US dollars to silence the patient.

Bribery to Chinese regulators 
However, the warnings of the whistleblower were just regarded as a "smear campaign" as shown in the company's confidential report acquired by the New York Times. Xinhua, a state run media agency, said that years before the scandal, the regulators across China were receiving tips about GSK's bribery. Allegedly in 2012, Mike Reilly, Zhang Guowei and Zhao Hongyan of the company even founded a risk management unit to cope with the tips. Allegedly executives of GSK bribed regulators to change their focus to "unequal competition" instead of "commercial bribery". The executive admitted that the company tried to limit the fine within 50,000 dollars but failed.

Sex tape of the China head 
In March, 13 executives of the company's London headquarter, including the CEO Andrew Witty, received an email with a sex tape as an attachment from an anonymous writer called "gskwhistleblower." The secretly filmed tape showed Mark Reilly's sex with his girlfriend. The film had been edited to disguise the location, but had been filmed in the bedroom of Mr.Relly's Shanghai apartment. After receiving the email he moved to a more secure location.  The email accused the company and Mark Reilly of using China Comfort Travel to bribe doctors.

GSK investigation into the whistleblower 
In April 2013, Mark Reilly, GSK's China head paid Peter Humphrey's ChinaWhys, a small risk consultancy which served Dell and Dow Chemical, to investigate into the break-in at his apartment and estimate the potential influence of the fired former employee, Vivian Shi, who was thought to be the whistleblower, in the government. Humphrey believed he was investigating a smear campaign. He visited Lanson Place where the tape was filmed and compiled a dossier of the potential suspects.  On 6 June 2013, Humphrey submitted a report to GSK where he believed Shi to be the responsible party.

Internal investigation 
GSK's China business was plagued with alleged bribery. 56 employees in China were dismissed in the year before the scandal, among a total of 312 dismissals. Although the company did investigate into the allegations stated by the whistleblower, a week before the Chinese investigation, the internal investigation was concluded with "no evidence of corruption or bribery in our China business." The New York Times said an internal audit in 2011 already show serious problems in GSK China's facility.

Police investigations

Early evidence 
The Chinese police denied that it was because of the internal conflicts and tips from inside the company that they launched the investigation.

According to Xinhua, a state run media outlet, and the police report, the Chinese investigations started with an investigation into an unknown Shanghai travel agency in early 2013. According to Shanghai-based media the Economic Observer, the travel agency, namely Shanghai Linjiang International Travel Agency Co., Ltd., was founded 7 years ago before the investigation, by a Shanghai real estate developer and a major Chinese footballer. The Chinese police said that the travel agency had few products but its revenue rose from million to hundreds of millions RMB. An investigation into the travel agency with help from other government offices identified its links to GSK and other pharmaceutical companies.

Police action 
The Public Security Ministry assigned Changsha Police to form a task force to investigate into the lead. The task force gathered evidence for GSK's bribery in ten plus Chinese provinces including Beijing, Shanghai, Liaoning, Xinjiang in a year-long period. Shanghai and Zhengzhou Police were also assigned to make the investigation into the suspected economic crimes.

On 27 June and 10 July 2013, the Changsha Police, with the help from Shanghai and Zhengzhou Police, carried out raids in multiple GSK offices and related travel agencies in Beijing, Shanghai, and Nanjing, acquiring files and laptops and interrogating employees. 4 executives were arrested in Shanghai, including Mike Reilly, the company's China head and protagonist of the sex tape. A total of 14 were arrested. The Changsha Police announced the operation in a short statement on Weibo on 28 June. Besides, AstraZeneca, UCB and other pharmaceutical companies' employees were also questioned by the State Administration for Industry and Commerce and the police.

GSK response 
Mike Reilly left China on 27 June when police took action at GSK China, which was not stopped by the police. In a police press, head of China's fraud unit Gao Feng said GSK was the boss in the bribery networks. Gao continued, "This is a very serious violation and a high-profile case. We are wondering why we have not received any information. As for the chief of the China business, you had better ask him yourself why he has left China and is not willing to return so far." But he also said he was willing to cooperate with overseas partners. GSK responded that it would closely cooperate with the Chinese authorities. Later, Reilly voluntarily returned to China to help the police with the investigations.

Chinese media coverage

Bribery to doctors 
The patent of GSK's leading hepatitis drug, Heptodin, expired in 2006. To cope with this, the company launched Changcheng and Longteng where the company used bribery to avoid Chinese doctors using Chinese equivalent of Heptodin.

According to Gao Feng, head of the economic crimes investigation unit at China's Public Security Ministry, GSK transferred 3 billion yuan to over 700 travel agencies and consultancies during a 6-year period, through which the company bribed doctors, hospitals, officials and medical associations. GSK bought services from the travel agencies at prices much higher than real prices, so that the agencies were able to serve as a fund for bribery which was independent of internal financial regulations of the company.

Xinhua described the hierarchy of GSK's bribery networks, where the company reps bribed ordinary doctors, area managers bribed major clients, regional manager bribed VIPs, the marketing department bribed academics, and the VIP department bribed institutes. To avoid regulation, the company paid 7 smaller drug companies including Jiangsu Tailing to sell its products. The company bought cars, cameras, televisions, electrical autos and other non-medical equipment to bribed centers of disease control and vaccine injection centers for ¥13m.

Distorted drug prices 
GSK's Lamivudine was priced at 142 RMB in Mainland China, while it only cost 18RMB, 26RMB, 30RMB to buy the drug in Korea, Canada and Britain respectively. Adefovir Dipivoxil, another product of GSK, was as expensive as 182 RMB, but it only costs 103.5RMB and 59.92RMB to buy them in Japan and Hong Kong. The police investigation also showed how GSK manipulated their drug prices in China, which took 5 measures:

 The company would first do market research in China. If there were similar drugs in China, they would make the prices of the drugs as a reference, or else, the company could price the drug "as high as it wanted."
 GSK China then reported the prices to the financial sector of GSK.
 GSK then sent the prices in China to GSK's transfer pricing (TP) center to calculate the importing prices and cost prices.
 When the prices were approved by the TP center, GSK China would import the drugs at the calculated importing prices.
 GSK China then would apply for approval from China's Development and Reform Commission for a new price based on the calculated importing price.

Chen Hongbo, former manager of GSK China, said to Xinhua that transfer pricing was a common strategy of multinationals, where a product was first sold to a middle country at a high price, and then it was imported to the destination at an even higher price based on the sale price in the middle country. Another way was to import raw materials for drugs. For example, Zinacef's raw material was packed in Cyprus and then was imported to Italy at a transferred price. After bottled in Italy, the bottled drug was imported to China at a much higher price. After it was labelled in China, the price would be even higher. The police told media that during 2009–12, GSK China's revenues of main business were ¥397.8m, ¥486.2m, ¥552.9m, ¥697.5m, but profits were merely ¥11m, ¥-4.7m, ¥6.0m, ¥-18.8m, which was owing to the company's transfer pricing strategy. Another manager of the company Liang Hong said that this helped the company avoid taxation in China.

GSK used bribery to stimulate the sales of extravagantly expensive drugs. A GSK rep told Xinhua that her boss said to her, "if the doctor wants money, then give them money; if the doctor wants academic achievements, then provides them with the opportunity." Liang Hong estimated that 30% of the drug prices were used in bribery in GSK China's sales. Although the compliance department and Internal Audit Department of GSK China showed evidence to the company that the company was faking invoices and fabricating records and books, the warnings were not taken seriously. Lan Shengke, an executive of GSK China, said that Mike Reilly even fired a director at the compliance department as the strict enforcement of the compliance rules affected sales performance in 2011.

Court ruling 
The trial on the company's commercial bribery was held in the Chinese city of Changsha on 19 September 2014. According to Xinhua, the trial at Changsha Intermediate People’s Court was not public as requested by GSK who wanted to keep business secrets. Mike Reilly was sentenced to 3-year jail sentences with 4-year suspension and deportation from China. Other three Chinese GSK employees were sentenced to 2 to 4 years. The company was sentenced to a record 3 billion yuan fine.

The fine was the largest corporate fine in China, but GSK did not defend its actions. In a statement after the trial, the company said it "apologizes to the Chinese patients, doctors and hospitals, and to the Chinese government and the Chinese people." The company said it had learnt from the mistakes and would do "tangible actions to establish itself as a model for reform in China’s healthcare industry." The company also promised to continue to invest in China and would change its incentive program fundamentally. A source told China Business Networks that the sales group for hepatitis drugs, which was related to the company's bribery plans, was downsized after the scandal.

Impact

Sales strategies of GSK 
Although the China market only contributed to a small fraction of overall revenue of GSK, it is the fastest-growing markets of the company. The company had heavily invested in the market, where it built both clinical and research facilities. GSK's sales in China recorded a 25% drop in the second quarter of 2014. Globally, the quarterly profits fell by 14% to £1.3bn, which was below analysts' forecasts, leading to a 5% fall in its shares price, the biggest single fall on FTSE 100. The company still faced investigation by UK's Serious Fraud Office and US department of justice, due to the laws against overseas corruption in the two countries where GSK was listed.

The legal suits in China forced the company to make a statement in December 2013, where changes in incentive programs, including cancelling individual sales targets and related bonus, were put forwards and expected to be enforced since 2014. To educate doctors about its products "transparently and without any perception of conflict of interest," the company also aimed to stop direct payment to any attendees at medical conferences by 2016, which was considered a significant move by the British Medical Association.

Following the scandal, GSK promised to lower the prices of its products in China, which was regarded as a signal to other drugmakers in China. National Development and Reform Commission said it would examine the drug prices by 60 firms, after it had succeeded in making some foreign infant formula producers to lower the price in an earlier price-related inquiry. But the low prices was predicted not to last long without a systematic change to China's healthcare system. Many Chinese doctors said they had no choice but to use these foreign drugs, when Chinese patients had little trust in the quality of the Chinese equivalents.

Foreign firms in China's anti-corruption campaign 
For a long time, corruption had been usually considered as part of the cost of doing business in China, and the medical industry was no exception. GSK's case occurred during the backdrop of Xi Jinping's anti-corruption campaign, which was believed to be focused on eliminating political opponents rather than stamping out corruption. Ben Cavender, an associate principal at China Market Research Group, said that the GSK's case could be part of the greater trend of fighting against corruption, where foreign firms were advised to carefully obey the law. However, the American Chamber of Commerce in China and US-China Business Council published reports, saying that foreign companies in China felt increasingly targeted by Chinese regulators. The president of the US-China Business Council doubted whether China was using such kinds of probes to protect its domestic industry.

The anti-corruption effort backfired at the communication between international pharmaceutical firms and Chinese academics and local firms. A senior research director in Shanghai admitted money-involving new cooperation between international pharmaceutical firms and Chinese academics and hospitals were suspended in 2013. Pharmaceutical companies usually invested in continuing medical education (CME) where the latest medical progress was discussed in order to encourage doctors to use their products. While CME was strictly regulated in Europe and the US, there was little oversight in emerging markets such as China. In China, foreign pharmas were usually the ones who paid for the educational programs that few Chinese companies paid.

Aftermath

Humphrey's privacy breach 
According to lawyers via the Financial Times, China's privacy law had become from one of the loosest one to a tighter one. In 2009, the country amended the criminal law to prohibit illegal transfer or trade of personal data and punish anyone who wants to buy or sell them. Violation of the law can lead to up to 3 years in jail.

On 10 July, which was 2 weeks after the police operations at GSK offices, Shanghai police arrested Humphrey and his wife Yu at their Shanghai apartment, charging them with privacy law breach. Harvard Humphrey, the son of Peter Humphrey accused of GSK of engaging his father “under false pretenses”, and described his father as "an honorable and law-abiding man". Humphrey and his wife Yu said that they accepted the offer as they believed that the bribery allegations were false and that they were investigating a smear campaign. Humphrey said on Chinese national television that it was not his intention to break any Chinese law. He refused to confess to the charges levelled against him..

Humphrey and Yu were found to have acquired 256 items of personal information. Humphrey was sentenced to 2 and a half and Yu was sentenced to 2 years by the Shanghai First Intermediate People’s Court, which was a much more severe sentence compared to other cases of similar conditions in Shanghai. After being denied care and tortured, Humphrey was released 7 months early and his wife Yu was released about the same time. They left China and went to the UK on 16 June 2015.

Illegal dismissal 
In the dismissal announced on 6 March 2015, 3 pregnant women and 4 nursing mothers were laid off. According to a former employee, the company talked to them individually, claiming that the employees had misbehavior and it had evidence for that. The company asked the employees to submit a resignation report by 9 March, and the company would consider it as a voluntary resignation. The employees were threatened by the company as it would leave a black mark in their employees' documents if the employees refused to comply with the requests. The laid-off employees' access to their office and emails were cut right on the day of the talk.

GSK China identified and terminated more than 110 employees which it had "dismissed as a result of a crackdown on illegal expenses" during the period preceding the scandal. The laid-off employees rallied before the GSK's Shanghai headquarter to protests against the dismissal. Approximately half of the terminated workers appealed their dismissal, and GSK's refusal to reimburse employees for expenses incurred before termination, before a labour dispute arbitration committee.

Vivian Shi and the whistleblower 
According to the New York Times, the whistleblower could be more than one person, as the emails to regulators were written in fluent English via a Gmail account while the emails with a sex tape were written in poor English thorough a Chinese email service. One of the email addresses responded to the New York Times, which denied Vivian Shi as a whistleblower. The response added,
The company denied that it was trying to dig out the whistleblower and instead the company was trying to fix a security hole for its employees. In 2015, Shi rejoined the company that fired her three years ago. GSK confirmed the information but refused to make further comment. Friends of Humphrey/Yu couple believed Shi was a key figure in the couple's detention and the couple's investigations into Shi's political relations resulted in them being sent to jail.

Investigations by other government

UK Serious Fraud Office 
UK's Serious Fraud Office initiated an investigation in 2014, but the cased was closed by its new director Lisa Osofsky in 2019, after costing £7.5 million in the investigation. The Office's director said,

US Securities and Exchange Commission 
As GSK bribery in China was a breach of US's Foreign Corrupt Practices Act during 2010–13, the Securities and Exchange Commission launched an investigation into the company. In September 2016, GSK agreed to pay a civil penalty of $20 million to settle the case, but it did not admit or deny the allegations.

References 

GSK plc litigation
2013 in China
2014 in China
Medical scandals in China